Bartłomiejowice  is a village in the administrative district of Gmina Wąwolnica, within Puławy County, Lublin Voivodeship, in eastern Poland.

The village has an approximate population of 180.

References

Villages in Puławy County